Natalya Aleksandrivna Voytsekh (born 21 June 1992) is a Ukrainian badminton player. She competed at the 2015 Baku European Games.

Achievements

BWF International Challenge/Series 
Women's singles

Women's doubles

  BWF International Challenge tournament
  BWF International Series tournament
  BWF Future Series tournament

References

External links 
 

1992 births
Living people
Sportspeople from Dnipro
Ukrainian female badminton players
Badminton players at the 2015 European Games
European Games competitors for Ukraine
21st-century Ukrainian women